The 82nd Chemical Battalion was a United States Army Chemical training battalion for enlisted soldiers entering into the MOS 54B and officers in MOS 74A that was stationed at Fort McClellan, Alabama between 1986 and 1999.  At which time, Fort McClellan was closed and the unit transferred to Fort Leonard Wood, Missouri.  The battalion was deactivated in September 2007, and the 84th Chemical Battalion took over its duties.  The battalion was activated as a Chemical Mortar Battalion at Fort Bliss, Texas, in World War II.

References

External links
 http://www.myguidon.com/index.php?option=com_content&task=view&id=4726

Chemical battalions of the United States Army
Battalions of the United States Army in World War II
Military units and formations established in 1942
1942 establishments in the United States